= 1943–44 Baylor Bears basketball team =

American college basketball season

1943–44 Baylor Bears men's basketball
- Conference: Southwest Conference
- Record: 6-12 (2-10 SWC)
- Head coach: Van Sweet

1943–44 Southwest Conference men's basketball standings
	Conf.				Overall
Team	W		L	PCT	W		L	PCT
Rice	11	–	1	.917	15	–	5	.750
Arkansas	11	–	1	.917	16	–	8	.667
Texas	6	–	6	.500	14	–	11	.560
SMU	6	–	6	.500	8	–	9	.471
TCU	6	–	6	.500	9	–	12	.429
Baylor	2	–	10	.167	6	–	12	.333
Texas A&M	0	–	12	.000	2	–	15	.118

The 1943-44 Baylor Bears basketball team represented the Baylor University during the 1943-44 college men's basketball season.

== Schedule ==
Date time, TV	Opponent	Result	Record	Site city, state
*	at Waco AF	L 23-41	0-1	Waco, TX
*	Waco AF	W 36-29	1-1	Waco, TX
*	at Southwestern	L 28-57	1-2	Waco, TX
*	at Corsicana AF	W 45-32	2-2	Corsicana, TX
*	Corsicana AF	W 42-34	3-2	Waco, TX
	Rice	L 27-49	3-3	Waco, TX
	at Texas	L 38-55	3-4	Austin, TX
	Texas A&M	W 48-43	4-4	Waco, TX
	at TCU	L 38-48	4-5	Fort Worth, TX
	Texas	L 29-53	4-6	Waco, TX
*	North Texas	W 38-35	5-6	Waco, TX
	at Texas A&M	W 42-39	6-6	College Station, TX
	Arkansas	L 28-45	6-7	Waco, TX
	Arkansas	L 34-36	6-8	Waco, TX
	at SMU	L 41-64	6-9	Dallas, TX
	SMU	L 44-57	6-10	Waco, TX
	at Rice	L 38-65	6-11	Houston, TX
	TCU	L 38-49	6-12	Waco, TX
*Non-conference game. (#) Tournament seedings in parentheses.
